Əhmədli is a village and municipality in the Beylagan District of Azerbaijan. It has a population of 1,348.

References 

Populated places in Beylagan District